Fuzzy Logic is an album by American pianist David Benoit released in 2002, and recorded for the GRP label. The album reached #6 on Billboard's Contemporary Jazz chart.

Track listing
All tracks composed by David Benoit; except where indicated
"Snap!" (David Benoit, Rick Braun) - 4:24
"Fuzzy Logic" - 5:09
"Someday Soon" (David Benoit, Rick Braun) - 4:55
"Then the Morning Comes" (John Barry, Greg Camp) - 3:35
"Reflections" - 4:03
"Coming Up for Air" (Stuart Wade, Neil Angilley, David Benoit) - 4:56
"You Read My Mind" (David Benoit, Rick Braun, Stan Sargeant) - 4:51
"War of the S.U.V.'s" - 4:44
"Tango in Barbados" (Stuart Wade, Neil Angilley, David Benoit) - 4:13
"One Dream at a Time (June's Song)" - 2:51

Personnel 

 David Benoit – acoustic piano (1-10), Hammond B3 organ (2, 4, 8), arrangements (2, 4, 5, 8, 10), conductor (5, 10)
 Rick Braun – programming (1, 7), trumpet (1, 2, 8), arrangements (1, 3, 7)
 Neil Angilley – keyboards (6, 9)
 Dave Tyler – programming (6, 9)
 Ross Bolton – guitar (1)
 Pat Kelly – guitar (2, 5, 8), lead guitar (4)
 Tony Maiden – guitar (2), rhythm guitar (4)
 Paul Jackson, Jr. – guitar (3)
 Ian Crabtree – guitar (6, 9)
 Abraham Laboriel – bass (2, 4, 8)
 Roberto Vally – bass (3)
 Dean Taba – bass (5)
 Phil Mulford – bass (6, 9)
 Stan Sargeant – bass (7)
 Steve Ferrone – drums (2, 4, 8)
 Jeff Olson – drums (5)
 Brad Dutz – percussion (3, 8)
 Larry Bunker – vibraphone (4, 5)
 Scott Breadman – percussion (7)
 Mick Wilson – timbales (9)
 Andy Suzuki – saxophone (2, 8)
 Steve Holtman – trombone (2)
 Nick Lane – trombone (2)
 Rick Baptist – trumpet (2)
 Jon Clarke – oboe (5, 10)
 Richard Todd – French horn (5, 10)
 Tim Weisberg – flute (5, 10)
 Suzie Katayama – orchestra contractor (2, 4, 5, 8, 10)
 Ken Gruberman – music preparation (2, 4, 5, 8, 10)
 Stuart Wade – arrangements (6, 9)

Production 
 Rick Braun – producer (1, 3, 7)
 David Benoit – producer (2, 4, 5, 8, 10)
 Stuart Wade – producer (6, 9)
 Ben Harner – executive producer 
 Steve Sykes – recording and mixing (1, 3, 7)
 Clark Germain – recording and mixing (2, 4, 5, 8, 10)
 Charlie Paakkari – assistant engineer (3)
 Mick Wilson – recording and mixing (6, 9)
 Chris Bellman – mastering 
 Yvonne Wish – production coordinator 
 John Newcott – release coordinator
 Kelly Pratt – release coordinator
 Hollis King – art direction 
 Rika Ichiki – design 
 Dave Ellis – illustration
 Rocky Schenck – photography
 Mixed at The Village Recorder (Los Angeles, CA), Brauntosoarus Studios and Village Studios.
 Mastered at Bernie Grundman Mastering (Hollywood, CA).

Charts

References

External links
David Benoit-Fuzzy Logic at Discogs

2002 albums
David Benoit (musician) albums
GRP Records albums